The orange-throated flat lizard (Platysaurus monotropis) is a species of lizard in the Cordylidae family.

Description
Orange-throated flat lizard females and juveniles are black-brown with white stripes. Males have orange heads, green-blue bodies, and a red tail. A black collar is present on the throat.

Geography
Orange-throated flat lizards live in northern Transvaal in South Africa. They live in mesic savannahs with sandstone outcrops.

References

External links
 Taxonomy
 More Information

Platysaurus
Reptiles of South Africa
Reptiles described in 1994
Taxa named by Neils Henning Gunther Jacobsen